Chalcidoptera nigricans is a moth in the family Crambidae that was first described by Max Gaede in 1917. The moth's origins can be traced from Cameroon and Guinea Equatorial.

The wingspan of this species is about 18–20 mm.

References

Moths described in 1917
Spilomelinae